The 1976–77 Copa del Rey was the 75th staging of the Spanish Cup. The competition began on 22 September 1976 and concluded on 25 June 1977 with the final.

First round

|}
Bye: Español, Real Madrid, Athletic Bilbao, FC Barcelona and Atlético Madrid.

Second round

|}
Bye: Español, Real Madrid, Athletic Bilbao, FC Barcelona and Atlético Madrid.

Third round

|}
Bye: Zaragoza, Athletic Bilbao, FC Barcelona and Atlético Madrid.

Fourth round

Bye: all teams except Córdoba, Celta, Zaragoza and Granada.

|}

Round of 16

|}

Quarter-finals

|}

Semi-finals

|}

Final

|}

References

External links
 rsssf.com
 linguasport.com

Copa del Rey seasons
Copa del Rey
Copa